Rhodonite is a manganese inosilicate, (Mn, Fe, Mg, Ca)SiO3 and member of the pyroxenoid group of minerals, crystallizing in the triclinic system. It commonly occurs as cleavable to compact masses with a rose-red color (the name comes from the Greek ῥόδος rhodos, rosy), often tending to brown because of surface oxidation.  The rose-red coloring is caused by manganese(2+).

Rhodonite crystals often have a thick tabular habit, but are rare. It has a perfect, prismatic cleavage, almost at right angles. The hardness is 5.5–6.5, and the specific gravity is 3.4–3.7; luster is vitreous, being less frequently pearly on cleavage surfaces. The manganese is often partly replaced by iron, magnesium, calcium, and sometimes zinc, which may sometimes be present in considerable amounts; a greyish-brown variety containing as much as 20% of calcium oxide is called bustamite; fowlerite is a zinciferous variety containing 7% of zinc oxide.

The inosilicate (chain silicate) structure of rhodonite has a repeat unit of five silica tetrahedra. The rare polymorph pyroxmangite, formed at different conditions of pressure and temperature, has the same chemical composition but a repeat unit of seven tetrahedra.

Rhodonite has also been worked as an ornamental stone. In the iron and manganese mines at Pajsberg near Filipstad and Långban in Värmland, Sweden, small brilliant and translucent crystals (pajsbergite) and cleavage masses occur. Fowlerite occurs as large, rough crystals, somewhat resembling pink feldspar, with franklinite and zinc ores in granular limestone at Franklin Furnace in New Jersey.

Rhodonite is the official gemstone of the Commonwealth of Massachusetts.

See also
 Khondalite
 Wollastonite, CaSiO3
 Enstatite, with MgSiO3 and FeSiO3 end-members

References

Gemstones
Manganese(II) minerals
Iron(II) minerals
Magnesium minerals
Calcium minerals
Pyroxene group
Triclinic minerals
Minerals in space group 2